Karl Bitar was the 9th National Secretary of the Australian Labor Party and former General Secretary of NSW Labor. He now works as an executive for Crown Limited.

Political career 
Between 1999 and 2004, Bitar worked as an organiser for NSW Labor.

He was then elevated to Assistant General Secretary of NSW Labor in 2004 before becoming General Secretary in 2007. In his role as General Secretary, Bitar acted as NSW Campaign Director at the 2007 federal election.

Bitar then succeeded Tim Gartrell as National Secretary of the Australian Labor Party in 2008. As National Secretary, he oversaw the 2010 Australian federal election campaign which left Labor in minority government. Several sources at the time credited Bitar for the poor result. However, Bitar largely cited other factors, including expectations of a Labor win, the media's failure to properly scrutinise Tony Abbott, the leaks and Mark Latham, as issues that led to the result. The campaign review found his specific efforts in NSW largely helped Labor gain victory. Bitar resigned as National Secretary in 2011.

He is a member of the right faction.

Personal life 
Bitar is of Lebanese descent and is a Melkite Catholic.

References

Australian people of Lebanese descent
Living people
Year of birth missing (living people)
Australian Labor Party officials